Galaxie is a Canadian digital television radio service.

Galaxie may also refer to:

Ford Galaxie, an automobile made by the Ford Motor Company
Galaxie 500, a 1980s American indie rock band
Galaxie (band), a Canadian rock band
"Galaxie" (song), a 1995 song by Blind Melon
Galaxie (magazine), a Malaysian entertainment magazine
Galaxie TV, a Czech television station, see Ice hockey broadcasting
Galaxie Corporation, a cargo airline in the Democratic Republic of Congo

See also
Galaxi, a roller coaster
Galaxy (disambiguation)
Galaxia (disambiguation)